Leucine-rich repeat-containing protein 41 is a protein that in humans is encoded by the LRRC41 gene.

References

Further reading

LRR proteins